The discography of Rashawnna "Shawnna" Guy, an American rapper from Chicago, consists of two studio albums, one collaborative studio album with Lateefa "Teefa" Harland as Infamous Syndicate, three mixtapes, and thirty-six singles (including twenty-two as a featured artist).

Studio albums

Infamous Syndicate albums

Official mixtapes

Singles

Solo singles

Featured singles

Other charted songs

Guest appearances

Videography 

 "What’s Your Fantasy" (Ludacris featuring Shawnna)
 "Stand Up" (Ludacris featuring Shawnna)
 "Shake Dat Shit" (featuring Ludacris)
 "Gettin' Some"
 "Damn"
 "Caught Him Lookin'"
 "Loverboy (Remix)" (Mariah Carey featuring Da Brat, Ludacris, Shawnna & Twenty II)
 "Dude (Remix)" (Beenie Man featuring Ms. Thing & Shawnna)
 "All The Way Turnt Up NB Remix" (One Chance featuring T-Pain)
 "Point Em Out" (Tay Dizm featuring Shawnna)
 "Never Leave My Girl"
 "Lap Dance" She-Mix Ft GMGIRLS
 "Horror Show" Ft GMGIRLS
 "Big Fat" Ft Chella H
 "Snapbacks & Tattoo" She-Mix
 “What You Mean?” Ft HearonTrackz El aka HearonTrackz

References

External links

Discographies of American artists
Hip hop discographies